Hegel Bulletin (previously Bulletin of the Hegel Society of Great Britain) is a bi-annual peer-reviewed academic journal covering the thought of Georg Wilhelm Friedrich Hegel published by Hegel Society of Great Britain. It was established in 1980. The editors are Christoph Schuringa and Alison Stone.

See also 
 Hegel-Jahrbuch
 List of philosophy journals

References

External links 
 

Biannual journals
Publications established in 1980
Works about Georg Wilhelm Friedrich Hegel
Hegel
1980 establishments in England
Cambridge University Press academic journals
English-language journals